Leucocyte is a posthumous jazz album that Esbjörn Svensson Trio released on 30 September 2008 after pianist Esbjörn Svensson had died in June 2008.

Track listing 
 Decade
 Premonition I: Earth
 Premonition II: Contorted
 Jazz
 Still
 Ajar
 Leucocyte I: Ab Initio
 Leucocyte II: Ad Interim
 Leucocyte III: Ad Mortem
 Leucocyte IV: Ad Infinitum

Reception
Allmusic found that "more than any other recording issued by this excellent band, Leucocyte captures the art of music making at the moment of conception." PopMatters said that the album "is refreshing if not always easy or fun listening. E.S.T. could have continued making contemplative or gospel-tinged acoustic jazz in the Jarrett/ECM mode (the brief “Ajar” here is a fine example), but Svensson and his group have been frying bigger fish from the start."

Charts

Weekly charts

Year-end charts

References

2008 albums
Esbjörn Svensson Trio albums
ACT Music albums